Martin Vanhaeren (born 5 April 1998) is a Belgian motorcycle racer.

Career
In 2016, Vanhaeren was scheduled to make his full-time Grand Prix debut in the Moto3 World Championship with CIP alongside the Japanese Tatsuki Suzuki on a Mahindra MGP3O, but later the Italian Fabio Spiranelli was announced in his place.

References

External links
Profile on MotoGP.com

1998 births
Living people
Belgian motorcycle racers